OTI Festival 1974 was the third edition of the annual OTI Festival. It was held in Acapulco, Mexico, following the country's victory at the 1973 contest with the song "Que alegre va María" by Imelda Miller. Organised by the Organización de Televisión Iberoamericana (OTI) and host broadcaster Televisa, the contest was held at the Ruiz de Alarcón Theatre on Saturday 26 October 1974 and was hosted by Raul Velasco and Lolita Ayala.

This festival was marked by the debut of seven countries, which led to a sudden rise in the number of participating entries. The winner was Puerto Rico with the song "Hoy canto por cantar", performed by Nydia Caro.

Background 
According to the original rules of the OTI Festival, the winning country would organize and host the festival the following year. In this case, México and its representative, Imelda Miller, were the winners of the event in 1973. This meant that Televisa, the Mexican national broadcaster, had to organize the subsequent edition.

After a committee discussion held between the top charges of Televisa, it was decided that the host city would not be Mexico City as was previously planned; instead, it would be the southern touristic city of Acapulco, which is located on the Pacific coast of the Guerrero state of Mexico.

Venue 

Televisa decided that the third edition of the OTI Festival would be held in the Ruiz de Alarcón Theatre of Acapulco. The coastal city, known for its beaches, already had a previous experience hosting musical events. Back in 1969 and 1970, the town had already hosted the "Festival Mundial de la Canción Latina" (Worldwide Latin Music Festival), which is considered the closest antecedent of the OTI Festival.

The Ruiz de Alarcon Theatre of Acapulco was a very modern building that was started in 1969 and finished in 1973, a few months before the theatre was chosen as the OTI Festival venue. The mayorship of the city had decided to build the cultural building because the main theatre of the city was too small to host an event which had a rapidly growing popularity. The theatre, which turned into the host place of the Philharmonic Orchestra of Acapulco, had a seating capacity of over 2000 attendants, a similar figure to the seating capacity of the previous venues of the festival.

Participating countries 
The number of participating countries experienced a sudden rise from 14 to 19 countries. As happened in the previous editions, both the state-financed and the privately funded TV and radio stations that were members of OTI (Iberoamerican Television Organisation) participated in the event, sending their entrant and competing song.

Among the debuting countries that sent a delegation to Acapulco were most of the Central American ones: Guatemala, Honduras, El Salvador, and Nicaragua. Another debuting country was Ecuador, which was one of the few remaining South American countries that didn't debut in the inaugural edition of the festival.

That year the OTI Festival started expanding out of the traditional Latin American sphere. This was proved with the debut of Univision, the biggest Spanish-speaking TV channel of the United States and with the debut in the festival of the Netherlands Antilles, which although not a Spanish- or Portuguese-speaking country has got cultural and closeness ties with Venezuela.

However, for the first time, two previously participating nations decided to withdraw from the event. Portugal and Argentina were, for the first time, absent from the event, although their broadcasters would rejoin the festival in the following years.

Participating performers 
The participation of Jose Luis Rodriguez, also known as "El Puma", representing his country Venezuela should be taken into account. Although the singer didn't win the contest, his participation was acclaimed and his career experienced a huge rise, to the point that he turned into a symbol of Latin American pop music.

Another important performer was the Nicaraguan Hernaldo Zúñiga, who was already building a successful and recognized career as a singer-songwriter in his debuting home country.

The Chilean Jose Alfredo Fuentes, who had been selected in a national final, also made a significant contribution to the third edition of the festival. He was and still is one of the most prominent singers of his country. He would return to the event two years later.

The participation of the Dominican singer Charytín Goyco, who represented her home country in this third edition, is also important. She managed to get for her country an honorable position with a self-composed track.

Mexico, the host country, elected its representing performer Enrigue Cáceres with his song "Quijote" through its enormously popular national final, the "National OTI Contest".

Presenters 

The ceremony was opened by Imelda Miller, who was the previous year's winner and who sung her song "Que alegre va María" (How happy goes Mary).

Unlike the previous year in Belo Horizonte and just like in the inaugural OTI Festival in Madrid, the event was presented by two presenters: Raúl Velasco and Lolita Ayala, who are both well-known media personalities in Mexico.

As usual, the presenters made a brief introduction to the show by highlighting the main goals of the OTI as an organization and of the OTI Festival as a musical competition which was to foster musical and cultural ties between the Spanish-speaking and Portuguese-speaking countries. The introductory speech, in which the voting process was also explained, was given both in Spanish and Portuguese languages.

After that, both presenters introduced the performers and their countries shortly before they took the stage, and after the performance round was over, they contacted, by telephone, the TV studios of the participating broadcasters to ascertain the decision of the judges.

Running order 
The running order of the performances was decided just like the previous year in a draw that was organised by Televisa in collaboration with the Iberoamerian television Organisation (OTI) few days before the start of the festival.

The performance round was started by Dominican Republic. The Caribbean island was represented by Charytín Goyco and her song "Alexandra".

The host country which was Mexico, represented by Enrique Cáceres, appeared thirteenth on stage, while the performance round was closed by the Venezuelan entrant Jose Luis Rodríguez with the song "Vuélvete" (Return yourself).

As happened in previous years, almost all the songs that participated in the festival were sung in Spanish. This year, mainly because of the absence of Portugal, only one song was performed in Portuguese, the Brazilian entry.

Voting system 
Although the voting system followed the same dynamics of the previous years, with national juries from all the nineteen participating countries, this time the voting process was slightly modified. Due to the sudden increase in the number of participating countries and to the resulting considerably longer performance round, the OTI members decided to make the voting process more quick and agile. Then, this time the number of professional jurors of each of the participating countries was reduced from five to three.

The national juries were contacted by Televisa, the host broadcaster from Acapulco in order to know their final decision. Each one of the three national jurors voted only for their favourite song and the winning entry was the one which had more points at the end of the process. All the participating broadcasters gave their votes by telephone, this time without technical issues.

Result 
Unlike the previous year, in which there was a tie between two entries, which led to improvise a super-final, this year the winning song was known in the exact end of the voting process.

Nydia Caro, who represented the Caribbean island of Puerto Rico, with her song "Hoy canto por cantar", got for her country the first victory with 18 points, that's four points of difference with the Guatemalan performer Tania Zea, who got the second prize.

The third prize was for Jose Luis Rodríguez with his also warmly welcome song "Vuelvete".

Two countries were tied in the last place, Brazil with Agnaldo Rayol and his song "Porque?" and Perú, with Cesar Altamirano and his song "Mujer Primera". Both performers got zero points from the national juries which makes this year the first one in which some participating countries get no points.

Mexico, the host country and its representative Enrique Cáceres ended in an honorable tenth place.

As usual, the winning performer, Nydia Caro was invited to take the stage again and perform her song.

Audience and impact 
The festival maintained the viewing figures of the previous year with 200 million viewers and México was, again, thanks to its national final was the country where the number of viewers was higher, to the point that Acapulco, the host city and the whole country paralysed due to the enormous interest the public showed.

The victory of Puerto Rico in the festival was completely unexpected and polemical. The lyrics of the song were against the popular protest songs that filled the Latin American airplay. That song criticized the protest songs for being repetitive and for not offering real solutions to the problems that many Latin Americans had to suffer every day.

Nydia Caro, after her victory, was given in her arrival to San Juan a heroine welcome and was received by a huge crowd of people in the airport. Regardless of the controversial message of her song, her entry turned into an enormous hit in all Latin America and launched the career of the singer internationally.

The song of the third Classificate, "Vuelvete" (Return) by Jose Luis Rodriguez also turned into a hit both in Latin America and Spain. Since then his career also experienced a rise to the point that he became one of the biggest names in the Latin music industry.

References 

OTI Festival by year
1974 in Latin music
1974 music festivals
Music festivals in Mexico